Sir Francis Vernon Thomson, GBE (10 February 1881 - 8 February 1953) was the first and last Baronet of Monken Hadley, Hertfordshire. The title was created in 1938.

He was appointed as the chairman and managing director of the Union-Castle Line after the end of the First World War.  During World War II he was appointed as principal shipping advisor and controller of commercial shipping at the MoWT.  After the war he returned to his old rôle at Union-Castle.

He was a strict Methodist, a teetotaller and non-smoker and a lifelong bachelor.

References 

Baronets in the Baronetage of the United Kingdom
1881 births
1953 deaths
Members of the Order of the British Empire
Businesspeople from Manchester
Monken Hadley
20th-century English businesspeople